The Double Life of Henry Phyfe is a 17-episode American sitcom broadcast on ABC from January 13 to September 1, 1966, and starring Red Buttons.

Plot
Henry Phyfe (Buttons) was a mild-mannered accountant, until circumstances forced the American Counter Intelligence Service (CIS) to recruit him to impersonate a foreign agent named U-31, who had been killed in an automobile accident. The agent looked just like Phyfe, but the two men's personalities were drastically different. That severe contrast laid the groundwork for many of the episodes.

Phyfe's girlfriend, Judy Kimball, her mother Florence and his boss at the accounting firm, Mr. Hamble, were all unaware of Henry's secret life, with Gerald Hannahan, the regional director of the agency the lone person to know the secret. The characters of the girlfriend and mother-in-law were phased out halfway through the abbreviated run.

A recurring plot line was that U-31 had a wide range of skills (golf, samurai sword fighting, etc) which Phyfe would attempt to learn (generally unsuccessfully) just before his mission.

Cast
 Red Buttons as Henry Phyfe
 Fred Clark as Gerald B. Hannahan
 Zeme North as Judy Kimball
 Marge Redmond as Mrs. Florence Kimball
 Parley Baer as Mr. Hamble

Episodes

Overview
Actor Peter Bonerz (The Bob Newhart Show) had auditioned for the role of Henry Phyfe before Red Buttons was selected.

Buttons noted that, unlike Agent Maxwell Smart in NBC's new hit Get Smart, his character was shy, used no gadgets in his work, and was an impostor, not an actual agent. Phyfe's CIS boss was played by veteran character actor Fred Clark, who bore a superficial physical resemblance to Smart's "Chief" played by Edward Platt.

The show marked Buttons' return to weekly television after his variety show had ended a three-year run in 1955. During the interim, Buttons found roles in 15 different motion pictures, including an Academy Award-winning performance in the 1957 Marlon Brando film, Sayonara.

The concept of an "every man" recruited to impersonate someone of importance has been used for many years in literature (for example, The Prisoner of Zenda). A few months after the series' cancellation, the animated film, The Man Called Flintstone, featured the same premise as Henry Phyfe, while another TV series, The Man Who Never Was, debuted in the fall of 1966 with the premise reversed as a spy found himself impersonating a businessman who had been killed.

References

External links 
 

1966 American television series debuts
1966 American television series endings
1960s American sitcoms
American Broadcasting Company original programming
American spy comedy television series
Espionage television series
Television series by Filmways
Television series by MGM Television